Rushdy Saiid El Bughdady Abaza (3 August 1926 – 27 July 1980) was an Egyptian film and television actor. He was considered one of the most charming actors in the Egyptian film industry. He died of brain cancer at the age of 53.

Family
Rushdy Abaza was born in Sharqia, Egypt, to Egyptian father, Said Abaza, belonging to one of Egypt's most well-known families, the Abaza family. Rushdy attended school at Collège Saint Marc in Alexandria.

From his father's side he had three half-sisters, Ragaa, Mounira, Zeinab and one half-brother, Fekri (an actor). From his mother's side, he had one half-brother, Hamed. His only child is a daughter, Qismat (Eismat).

Marriages
Tahiya Karioka, Egyptian actress and dancer
Barbara, American mother of his only child, Qismat
Samia Gamal, famous Egyptian dancer (his longest marriage)
Sabah, famous Lebanese singer
Nabila Abaza

Filmography

He appeared in more than 100 films from 1948 until 1980; the year of his death.

1948
El-Millionaira El-Saghira (also known as The Small Millionaire)

1949
Zou El-Waghein (a.k.a. The Man with Two Faces)

1950
Emraa Menn Nar (a.k.a. A Woman of Fire)

1951
Awlad El shareh
Amina

1952
Al-Osta Hassan (a.k.a. Hassan the Craftsman)
El-Montasser (a.k.a. The Conqueror)
Awladi (a.k.a. My Children)

1953
Shamm al-Nesseem (a.k.a. The Spring Festival)
Mouamara (a.k.a. Conspiracy)

1954
Valley of the Kings - Robed Man (uncredited)
Gaaluni Mogremann (a.k.a. They Made Me a Murderer)
Erham Domouie

1955
Fortune carrée (a.k.a. Square Fortune)
Enni Rahhela (a.k.a. I Depart)
Hayah Aw Moot (a.k.a. Life or Death)
Arayess Fel-Mazad (a.k.a. Brides for Auction)

1956
Mawed Gharam
The Ten Commandments
Dalila
Mann al-Qattel? (a.k.a. Who Is the Murderer?)
Ezzay Ansak (a.k.a. How Would I Forget You)
Ismaeel Yassin fel-Boliss (a.k.a. Ismaeel Yassin in the Police)
Bahr al-Gharam (a.k.a. Sea of Love)

1957
Tamr Henna (a.k.a. Tamarind) - Hassan
Rodda Qalbi
La Anam - Samir
Port Said
Lan Abki Abadan (a.k.a. I Shall Never Weep)

1958
Jamila, the Algerian (a.k.a. Jamila Buhreid) - Bigeard
Toggar al-Moat (a.k.a. Death Merchants) - Ra'oof
Tareeq al-Ammal
Soultan (1958)
Emraa fel-Tareeq (a.k.a. A Woman on the Road)
Qoloob al-Azara (a.k.a. Hearts of the Virgins)

1959
 El rajul el thani
Seraa Fel-Nil
Samraa Sina (a.k.a. The Brunette of Sinai)
Rehla ilal kamar
Maleesh Gherak (a.k.a. I Have None But You) - Fathi
Katia tarik
Bafakkar Felli Nassini (a.k.a. Thinking of Who Forgot Me)
Ana Baree'a (a.k.a. I am Innocent)
Qatte' Tareeq (a.k.a. The Highwayman)

1960
Malak wa Shaytan (a.k.a. Angel and Devil) - Ezzat
Ana wa Ommi (a.k.a. My Mother and I)
Al-Moraheqat - Adel
Ya Habeebi (a.k.a. My Beloved)
Nehayat al-Tareeq (a.k.a. End of the Road)
Mufattesh al-Mabaheth (a.k.a. The Police Inspector)
Leqaa Fil-Ghoroob (a.k.a. Meeting at Sunset)
Kholkhal Habeebi (a.k.a. My Love's Bugle)
Al-Raggol al-Thani (a.k.a. The Second Man)

1961
Wa Islamah - Prince Baybars
Qalb Fi Zalam (a.k.a. Heart in the Shadows)
Hob wa Herman (a.k.a. Love and Deprivation)
He Talata - Kamal
Fi baitina rajul - Abd El-Hamid
Bela Awdah (a.k.a. No Return)

1962
Al zouga talattashar
Helwa wa kaddaba
Sett el-Banat (a.k.a. The Lady of All Women)
Ah Menn Hawwa (a.k.a. Beware of Eve)
Shahidat al-Hob al-Elahi (a.k.a. Martyr of Divine Love)

1963
La Waqt lel-Hob (a.k.a. No Time for Love)
Aroos al-Nil - Sami Fouad (Engineer)
Tareeq al-Shaytan (a.k.a. The Way of the Devil)
Al-Saherra al-Saghira (a.k.a. The Young Charming) - Essmat el daramaly
Al-Maganin Fi Naeem (a.k.a. The Insane Are in Bliss)
Amirat el Arab

1964
Al-Tareeq (a.k.a. The Road) - Saber
Fatat shaza
Al-Shayatin al-Talata (a.k.a. The Three Devils) - Saadawy
Al badawia fi Paris

1965
Ganab al-Safeer (a.k.a. His Excellency the Ambassador) - Amin (Samia's Father)

1966
Addow Al-Maraa (a.k.a. Enemy of Women) - Essa
Zawga Menn Paris
Shaqqet Al-Talabba (a.k.a. The Students' Apartment) - Saad Selim
Saghira Ala Al-Hob - Kamal 
Mabka el oshak
Howa wal-Nessaa (a.k.a. He and Women)
Guanab el safir
Al-Moshagheboon (a.k.a. Troublemakers) - Amin
Shaqawet Reggala (a.k.a. Naughty Men)
Mawwal (with Sabah the Lebanese Singer (A Ballad))

1967
Gareema fil-Hayy al-Hadi (a.k.a. Crime in the Calm District) - Ahmed Ezzat
Endama Nohheb (a.k.a. When We Love) - Ahmed
Al-Aib (a.k.a. Shame) - Mohamed El-Guindy
Al-Qobla al-Akhira (a.k.a. The Last Kiss) - Samy, The Director

1968
Raw'at el-Hob (a.k.a. The Beauty of Love) - Ahmed RagabHawwaa ala al-Tareeq (a.k.a. Eve on The Road) - KhaledAl-Massageen al-Thalatha (a.k.a. The Three Prisoners) - Mr. JoeBaba Ayez Keda (a.k.a. Dad Wants So) - Kamal

1969El Shoug'an el ThalathaNos Sa'a Gawaz (a.k.a. half an Hour of marriage)

1970Ghoroob wa Shorouq (a.k.a. Sunset and Sunrise) - EssamAl-Hob al-Daaie (a.k.a. The Lost Love)Al-Sarab (a.k.a. The Mirage) - Dr.AminAl-Ashrar (a.k.a. Evil Men)Nar al-Shouq (a.k.a. Flame of Crave)Zawga le-Khamsat Regal (a.k.a. Wife of Five Men)

1971Shay' fi Sadri (a.k.a. Something in My Heart)Ebnati al-Aziza (a.k.a. My Dear Daughter) - SherifEmraa wa Raggol (a.k.a. A Woman and A Man)

1972Emraa le-Koll al-Regal (a.k.a. A Woman for All Men) - ZakiSaaett al-Sefr (a.k.a. Zero Hour) - Hussein

1973Hekayti Maa Al-Zaman (a.k.a. My Story with Life)

1974Ayna Aqli (a.k.a. Where is My Mind) - Zohdi

1975Youm al-Ahad al-Damy (a.k.a. Bloody Sunday)Oreedo Hallan (a.k.a. Seeking A Solution)Hobi al awal wa al akhirAbadan Lann Aaoud (a.k.a. I Shall Never Come Back)

1976TawheedaA world of children - Helmi Abdulqader

1977Al Domo Fe Ouyon DhahekahAh Ya Leil Ya Zamman (a.k.a. Oh Night, Oh Life)

1978Wa Daa al-Omr Ya Waladi (a.k.a. Life Has Gone, My Son)Al-Qadi wal-Gallaad (a.k.a. The Judge)

1979Le-Mann Toshreq al-Shams (a.k.a. For Whom the Sun Rises?)

1980Daerrat al-Shakk (a.k.a. Circle of Suspicion)Azkeyaa Lakken Aghbeyaa (a.k.a. Intelligent But Stupid) - Hamdi (final film role)

See also
 Top 100 Egyptian films
List of Egyptian films of the 1960s
Salah Zulfikar filmography
Faten Hamama filmography

References

 Further reading 
Daoud, Abd el Ghani. (1997). Madâres el Adâ'’ el Tamthîlî fî târîkh el Cinema el Misreyah. Cairo: el Hay’a el ‘Ama li Qosour el Thaqâfah.
Kassem, Mahmoud. Mawsou‘at el Momathel fi-l-Cinema el ‘Arabiya. Cairo.
Labib, Fomil. (1973). Nougoum ‘Areftahom. Cairo: Ketab el Helal.
Ramzi, Kamal. (1997). Nogoum el Cinema el Misreyah: el Gawhar we-l-Aqni’a. Cairo: The Supreme Council for Culture.
Wassef, Magda. (1995). Egypte: 100 ans de Cinéma''. Paris: Institut du Monde Arabe.

External links
Rushdi Abaza on Egyptian State Information Service Site

1926 births
1980 deaths
People from Sharqia Governorate
20th-century Egyptian male actors
Deaths from brain cancer in Egypt
Collège Saint Marc, Alexandria alumni
Egyptian male film actors
Egyptian people of Italian descent
People from Mansoura, Egypt
Egyptian film actors
Egyptian stage actors 
Egyptian television actors